Blue Forgotten Planet is a Big Finish Productions audio drama based on the long-running British science fiction television series Doctor Who.

Plot

In the far future, the Earth is dying.  And the Viyrans seem to have a vested interest in its plight.

Cast

The Doctor – Colin Baker
Charley Pollard/Mila – India Fisher
Viyrans/Alien – Michael Maloney
David McCallister – JJ Feild
Ellen Green – Andree Bernard
Ed Driscoll – Alec Newman
Sergeant James Atherton – Sam Clemens
Soldier Clive – Alex Mallinson
Mila – Jess Robinson

The Three Companions
The Three Companions bonus feature, Part 7.

The Hunting Ground by Marc Platt

Polly – Anneke Wills
The Brigadier – Nicholas Courtney
Thomas Brewster – John Pickard
Garry Lendler – Russell Floyd

Continuity
The Viyrans claim to have encountered the Doctor several times and altered his memory at least once. The Fifth Doctor had his memories altered by the Viyrans in Mission of the Viyrans, when he last visited Gralista Social.
Charley Pollard finally parts company with the Doctor (from her perspective) in this story.  She has been a continuing companion in the Big Finish stories, starting with the Eighth Doctor in the 2001 story Storm Warning.

Critical reception
Doctor Who Magazine reviewer Matt Michael praised the performances of Colin Baker and India Fisher, but found the story to not have enough of the Charley and Mila plot.

References

External links
Blue Forgotten Planet

2009 audio plays
Sixth Doctor audio plays
Audio plays by Nicholas Briggs